Jacob Birtwhistle (born 4 January 1995) is an Australian triathlete.

Running career
At the 2013 IAAF World Cross Country Championships – Junior men's race he finished 41st.

He was crowned World School Cross Country Champion in 2012 in Malta.
Throughout 2009-2012 he won 11 Australian junior athletics champion titles in 1500m, 3000m and 2000m steeple.
2013 he transitioned to Triathlon but still managed to win the much coveted Zatopec u/20 3000m title.
2015 he was runner up in the Australian senior 10k Road Running Championships as a 20yr old.

Duathlon career
Birtwhistle is a former duathlon junior world champion.

Triathlon career

2013 season
Australian Junior champion,
Oceania junior champion,
u/23 Australian sprint champion,

2014 season
silver medallist World Junior Triathlon Championships

2015 season
He won the Under-23 World Championship.

2016 season
Birtwhistle finished fourth at the Yokohama event second at the Hamburg event of the 2016 ITU World Triathlon Series.

2017 season

Birtwhistle finished second at the Hamburg and Edmonton  events of the 2017 ITU World Triathlon Series.

2018 season

Birtwhistle came second in a home Commonwealth Games on the Gold Coast, Australia. He was also a member of the gold winning Australian mixed relay team. In the 2018 ITU World Triathlon Series he took silver in Yokohama and bronze in Edmonton and Montréal. He completed the year with 7th at the 2018 ITU World Triathlon Grand Final, also on the Gold Coast. That saw him finish third overall in the 2018 ITU World Triathlon Series.

2019 season

2019 saw Birtwhistle take his first gold at an ITU Triathlon World Series race, winning in Leeds (standard distance) and subsequently taking first place in Hamburg later that season (sprint distance).

References

1995 births
Australian male triathletes
Commonwealth Games gold medallists for Australia
Commonwealth Games medallists in triathlon
Commonwealth Games silver medallists for Australia
Commonwealth Games bronze medallists for Australia
Living people
Sportsmen from Tasmania
Triathletes at the 2018 Commonwealth Games
Triathletes at the 2022 Commonwealth Games
Triathletes at the 2020 Summer Olympics
Olympic triathletes of Australia
21st-century Australian people
Medallists at the 2018 Commonwealth Games
Medallists at the 2022 Commonwealth Games